The Polytechnic University of the Philippines College of Law, abbreviated as CL, is the law school of the Polytechnic University of the Philippines located in Manila, Philippines that was established in 2001. It ranks as one of the top law schools in the country in terms of percentile passing rate in the bar examination.

Admission 

Interested applicants who wish to study in the PUP College of Law must pass the PUP College of Law Entrance Examination (PUPCLEE). Furthermore, the applicant must be a graduate of a bachelor's degree and must have earned at least six (6) units in Mathematics, eighteen (18) units in English, and eighteen (18) units of social science subjects.

History 

In January 2001, the plans for the establishment of the Polytechnic University of the Philippines College of Law started when the then University President Dr. Ofelia M. Carague instructed the Dean of the College of Accountancy and Law to prepare a proposal for the establishment of the said college. In the early part of May in 2001, a meeting was held between the Vice President for Academic Affairs, the Dean of the College of Accountancy and Law and the Chairperson of the Department of Law to finalize the proposal to approve the establishment of the PUP College of Law. It was on May 25, 2001 when the PUP Board of Regents approved Resolution No. 115, Series of 2001, also known as “Resolution Approving the Establishment of the College of Law.” Former Supreme Court Associate Justice Dante Tiñga served as its first dean. 

In 2015, the PUP College of Law Research Corps was formed in the college. The research group was tasked to produce bar materials for the bar candidates. 

It was in 2016 when the college celebrated its 15th founding anniversary. A lecture series was organized by the college and was attended by hundreds of students, faculty members and employees. Past accomplishments were also mentioned by the College Dean Gemy Lito L. Festin such as the college's good performance in the bar examinations, the formation of research group, and the establishment of the Office of the Legal Aid which is active in giving extension services like free legal counseling to the nearby communities of the university.

Achievements 

The PUP College of Law is one of the top law schools in the country in terms of percentile passing rate in the Philippine Bar Examination. In the 2016 Bar Examination results released by the Supreme Court on May 3, 2017, a hundred percent of the first time takers from the college passed the bar exam. The results also revealed that 76.19 percent of the retakers from the college successfully passed the said exam. This gives the university a high passing rate of 83.33 percent, surpassing the 2016 national passing rate of 59.06 percent.

Notable Faculty Members 

Justice Dante O. Tiñga, Associate Justice of Supreme Court (2003 to 2009)

Dean Antonio G.M. La Viña, Dean School of Government, Ateneo School of Government, 3rd Placer 1989 Bar Exams

Elmer T. Rabuya, Known civilist, law books author

Cyril E. Ramos, Deputy Ombudsman

Rhett Emmanuel C. Serfino, Practicing Lawyer, 3rd Placer 1997 Bar Exams

Noel M. Ortega, Valedictorian, Bachelor of Laws San Sebastian College-Recoletos

Judy A. Lardizabal, 1st Placer, 2008 Bar Exams

Voltaire T. Duano, Labor Law expert, Valedictorian, Bachelor of Laws San Sebastian College-Recoletos

Organizations 

The college also has various student organizations actively participating in wide-variety of intercollegiate activities of law schools around the country. Some of which are CODAL (Christians on Demand at Law), PUP Law Moot Court Society, PUP Legal Aid Clinic and The Solicitor, formerly Hayag, their official student publication. These organizations help law students cope with the rigors of the legal studies and lighten the already high-pressure law school environment by getting involved in activities of their interests. They also engage in different social programs such as free legal assistance to the indigent members of adjacent barangays,  gift-giving to street kids during Christmas season and feeding program to the needy. 

In 2016, PUP Law Moot Court Society secured a championship place in a debate cup on International Humanitarian Law organized by the House of Representatives and the Philippine Red Cross. 

Every weekend, CODAL invites speakers from organized Christian groups and some of its members to share inspiring words and real-life testaments to the students for the latter to uplift spiritual aspects of life. They also provide free coffee during Saturdays.

References

External links 
 Polytechnic University of the Philippines College of Law – Official website
 Polytechnic University of the Philippines – Official website

College of Law
Law schools in the Philippines
Educational institutions established in 2001
2001 establishments in the Philippines